Lac de Coumasse or Estany de la Comassa is a lake in Pyrénées-Orientales, Pyrénées, France. At an elevation of 2160 m, its surface area is 0.04 km².

Coumasse